Charles Franklin Marsh (August 18, 1903 – January 15, 1984) was an American economist and academic who became the seventh president of Wofford College on September 1, 1958 and served until his retirement in 1968. A 1925 graduate of Lawrence University in Appleton, Wisconsin, he earned the Master of Arts from the University of Illinois in 1926, and the Ph.D. from Illinois in 1928. He was a faculty member at American University, and from 1930 to 1958, a professor of economics at the College of William and Mary. In his last six years at William and Mary, he was Dean of the Faculty. He was involved in civic affairs in Williamsburg, serving on several economic planning agencies. An active churchman, he was a member of several annual conference boards in the Virginia and South Carolina conferences and a member of the Methodist General Conference. Dr. Marsh also served as a member of the Methodist Commission on Church Union and as a member of the University Senate of the Methodist Church. Active in the affairs of the Southern Association of Colleges and Schools, he was a member of the SACS Executive Council at the time of the integration crisis at the University of Mississippi. Dr. Marsh retired from the presidency of Wofford in 1968, returning to Williamsburg to teach in the Graduate School at William and Mary. A dormitory at Wofford is named in his honor.

References

1903 births
1984 deaths
20th-century American educators
Heads of universities and colleges in the United States
Lawrence University alumni
University of Illinois alumni
Wofford College
American University faculty and staff
College of William & Mary faculty
20th-century American economists